is a municipality in Møre og Romsdal county, Norway. It is part of the Sunnmøre region of Western Norway. The administrative centre of the municipality is the village of Ørsta. Other villages in the municipality include Hovdebygda, Flåskjer, Liadal, Urke, Barstadvik, Åmdalen, Follestaddalen, Nordre Vartdal, Vartdal, Sæbø, Sætre, Store-Standal, and Ytre Standal.

The  municipality is the 171st largest by area out of the 356 municipalities in Norway. Ørsta is the 105th most populous municipality in Norway with a population of 10,833.

General information

The municipality of Ørsta was established on 1 August 1883 when it was separated from Volda Municipality. The initial population was 2,070. On 1 January 1893, the Ytrestølen farm (population: 13) was transferred from Ørsta to Volda. During the 1960s, there were many municipal mergers across Norway due to the work of the Schei Committee. On 1 January 1964, the municipality of Ørsta (population: 6,209) was merged with the neighboring municipalities of Hjørundfjord (population: 1,728) and Vartdal (population: 1,315) to form a new, larger municipality of Ørsta. On 1 January 2020, the Bjørke and Leira areas of Ørsta were transferred to the neighboring Volda Municipality.

Name
The municipality is named after the Ørstafjorden. The meaning of the name is unknown. Before 1918, the name was written Ørsten.

Coat of arms
The coat of arms was granted on 13 July 1984. The arms consist of three white or silver diamonds on a blue background. The three diamonds represent the mountains reflecting in the waters of the fjord.

Museums

Churches
The Church of Norway has three parishes within the municipality of Ørsta. It is part of the Søre Sunnmøre prosti (deanery) in the Diocese of Møre.

Geography

Apart from the mountains, Ørsta's dominant geographical feature is fjords: Storfjorden in the north, Vartdalsfjorden, Ørstafjorden in the west, and Hjørundfjorden in the east. Only in the south is it connected by land to neighbouring Volda Municipality. Otherwise, it borders the municipalities of Sula in the north, Hareid and Ulstein (by sea only) in the west, Sykkylven to the northeast, and Stranda to the southeast.

The municipality is also the heartland of the Sunnmørsalpene mountains, a particularly rugged and wild area of mountains in the southern part of Møre og Romsdal county.

Economy
Important sectors are mechanical industry and furniture manufacturing, agriculture, commercial fishing, and aquaculture. The first two are predominant in the village of Ørsta while agriculture dominates in adjacent valleys like the Follestaddalen, Åmdalen, and Bondalen valleys. On the other hand, the northern part of the municipality has strong maritime traditions, with Vartdal being the home of one of the largest factory trawler fleets in Norway.

Government
All municipalities in Norway, including Ørsta, are responsible for primary education (through 10th grade), outpatient health services, senior citizen services, unemployment and other social services, zoning, economic development, and municipal roads. The municipality is governed by a municipal council of elected representatives, which in turn elect a mayor.  The municipality falls under the Møre og Romsdal District Court and the Frostating Court of Appeal.

Municipal council
The municipal council of Ørsta is made up of 33 representatives that are elected to four year terms. The party breakdown of the council is as follows:

Mayor
The mayors of Ørsta (incomplete list):
2015–present: Stein Aam (Sp)
2011-2015: Rune Hovde (H)
2007-2011: Gudny Fagerhol (Ap)
2003-2007: Hans Olav Myklebust (FrP)
1992-2003: Nils Taklo (Sp)
1984-1991: Sigbjørn Kvistad (KrF)

Transportation
These include Ørsta–Volda Airport, Hovden (Hovdebygda), which is the regional airport for people living in the municipalities Ørsta, Volda, Vanylven, Sande, Ulstein, Hareid and Herøy, and European Route E39 which transects the municipality in a north–south direction. Ørsta is linked to Sula and Sykkylven by ferry on its northernmost extreme Festøy.

Notable residents

 Ivar Aasen (1813–1896) a Norwegian philologist, lexicographer, playwright and poet.
 Anders Hovden (1860–1943) a Norwegian Lutheran clergyman, hymnwriter poet and author
 Njål Hole MBE (1914–1988) a Norwegian chemical engineer and nuclear physicist
 Torbjørn Digernes (born 1947) a physicist and Professor of marine systems design
 Kari Sørbø (born 1955) a Norwegian radio personality, brought up in Ørsta
 Eldar Sætre (born 1956) a Norwegian businessman, CEO of Equinor
 Bjarte Engeset (born 1958) a Norwegian classical conductor
 Yngve Sætre (born 1962) a Norwegian record producer, musician on vocals and keyboard
 Marit Velle Kile (born 1978) a Norwegian actress in film and on TV 
 Audun Ellingsen (born 1979) a Norwegian jazz musician, plays upright bass
 Torgeir Standal (born 1990) a Norwegian jazz guitarist
 Vassendgutane (formed 1996) a Norwegian country and danseband

References

External links

Municipal fact sheet from Statistics Norway 
Official site of Ørsta Tourist Board
Ørsta kommune 

 
Municipalities of Møre og Romsdal
1883 establishments in Norway